The South Shore Estuary is an estuary located along the south shore of Long Island, between the mainland and the outer barrier islands, in eastern New York state.

Geography
The South Shore Estuary includes a series of interconnected bays, rivers, streams, wetlands and small islands located along Long Island's south shore between the mainland and the barrier islands. Reynolds Channel, West Bay, Middle Bay, East Bay, South Oyster Bay, Great South Bay, Patchogue Bay, Moriches Bay and Shinnecock Bay are part of this natural system, and familiar places to many.

Ecology

Estuaries are transition zones between the world's freshwater and marine ecosystems where fresh water mixes with salt water.

Long Island's South Shore estuary is a dynamic ecosystem, formed during the past 5,000 years by the interaction of a rising sea level with the glacially-deposited material that makes up Long Island.  In this estuarine environment, tidal marshes, mud and sand flats, underwater plant beds and broad shallows support microscopic plants and animals which, in turn, support the finfish, shellfish, waterfowl and other wildlife that typify the South Shore estuary.

is still changing and evolving in response to wave action, tides, coastal storms, and the continuing rise of sea level.

References 

Estuaries of New York (state)
Wetlands of New York (state)
Nature reserves in New York (state)
Landforms of Suffolk County, New York
Bodies of water of Suffolk County, New York